Kömlő is a village in Heves County, Northern Hungary Region, Hungary.

History
From 1600 to 1770 the place was uninhabited.

Sights to visit

  The catholic church

See also
 List of populated places in Hungary

References

External links
 Kömlő
 https://www.telepules.com/en/komlo_.html
 Kömlő község adatai
 https://www.facebook.com/mediakomlo/
 

Populated places in Heves County